Cheilosia  nigripes is a Palearctic hoverfly.

Description
Very similar to Cheilosia vicina with a black body bare eyes, black legs and fused antennal pits. The central prominence  of the face gently slopes downwards (not retrousse). Male: all the thorax hairs black  the tergites with fine punctures. Female:thorax with mainly dark hairs and tergites with coarse punctures. Wing length 6·25-7·5 mm

Distribution and biology
From Fennoscandia south to the Pyrenees; from England eastwards through Central
and Southern Europe (north Italy, Yugoslavia) into Turkey and European Russia 
through Siberia and the Russian Far East to the Pacific. 
The habitat is open grassy areas in Fagus , Abies and Picea forest up to the lowest levels of subalpine grassland. Flowers visited include white umbellifers Prunus padus, Ranunculus, Rubus idaeus, Taraxacum. Flies May to June, later at higher altitudes. The larva is  undescribed.

References

External links
 Images representing Cheilosia nigripes

Diptera of Europe
Eristalinae
Insects described in 1822
Taxa named by Johann Wilhelm Meigen